The 2013 Beach Soccer Intercontinental Cup was the third edition of the tournament, Beach Soccer Intercontinental Cup. It took place at Jumeirah Beach in Dubai, United Arab Emirates from 19 to 23 November 2013. Eight teams participated in the competition.

Participating teams

Rule change
There was a new rule change made known during this tournament. It was made known that if a match goes to penalties after extra time, it is no longer sudden-death. It is now the best of three penalty kicks per side. It is only sudden death if each side is level after the three PK rounds.

This rule change was instituted after the completion of the 2013 Mundialito de Clubes tournament and will apparently be permanent for all BSWW-sanctioned tournaments.

Group stage
The draw to divide the eight teams into two groups of four was conducted on 10 October 2013. The subsequent schedule was released on 29 October 2013.

All matches are listed as local time in Dubai, (UTC+4).

Group A

Group B

Classification stage

5–8 places

Seventh place match

Fifth place match

Championship stage

Semi-finals

Third place

Final

Awards

Top scorers

Final standings

References

External links
Beach Soccer Worldwide

Beach Soccer Intercontinental Cup
2012–13 in Emirati football
International association football competitions hosted by the United Arab Emirates
Intercontinental Cup
Intercontinental Cup